The 2022–23 Serbian football will be the 17th season of the Serbian football since its establishment in 2006.

National teams

Group B4

Group G

Group H

Men's football

UEFA competitions

Group H

Group D

External links
 
 UEFA

2022–23 in Serbian football